The Trinity Chapel Complex, now better known as the Serbian Orthodox Cathedral of St. Sava is a historic Eastern Orthodox church at 15 West 25th Street between Broadway and the Avenue of the Americas (6th Avenue) in the NoMad neighborhood of Manhattan, New York City.

The church building was constructed in 1850–55 and was designed by architect Richard Upjohn in English Gothic Revival style. It was built as one of several uptown chapels of the Trinity Church parish, but was sold to the Serbian Eastern Orthodox parish in 1942, re-opening as the Cathedral of St. Sava in 1944.

The church complex includes the Trinity Chapel School, now the cathedral's Parish House, which was built in 1860 and was designed by Jacob Wrey Mould, a polychromatic Victorian Gothic building which is Mould's only extant structure in New York City.  Attached to the sanctuary itself is the Clergy House at 26 West 26th Street, which was built in 1866 and was designed by Richard Upjohn and his son Richard M. Upjohn.

The chapel was designated a New York City landmark in 1968, and the complex was added to the National Register of Historic Places in 1982.

Most of the church was destroyed in a four-alarm fire on May 1, 2016. In June 2016 reports were circulating that the city of New York ordered that the remains of the structure be demolished, stating that the walls are too unstable to be allowed to stand.  The Buildings Department quickly clarified that the inspection was not complete and they had not ordered the immediate demolition of the building and instead is working with the parish to stabilize the structure.

Architecture 

The outside is made of heavy exterior blocks of the building were etched in a rough finish, accented with austere Gothic trim and details. The front façade sits on West 25th Street and faces south. The façade is supported by four stone buttresses, framed by delicate stone turrets at the sides, and punctuated by a large rose window above the entrance.

Prior to the fire that took place May 1, 2016, the church was known to have had one of the largest timber hammerbeam roofs in the City of New York.

History

Trinity Chapel
With the population of New York City moving ever-northward up Manhattan island in the mid-19th century, Trinity Church, the center of Episcopalianism in the city, needed to provide for its uptown parishioners, especially in the increasingly sought-after residential neighborhoods around Union and Madison Squares.  The church's solution was to build a chapel, named Trinity Chapel, on West 25th Street just off of Madison Square as an uptown annex.  The architect selected was Richard Upjohn, who designed the third and current version of Trinity Church, as well as the Church of the Ascension on Fifth Avenue and West 10th Street, as well as many other churches in the Gothic Revival mode in the northeast.

The parish was a wealthy and influential one, and Trinity was the only one of Trinity Church's chapels which was capable of supporting itself without assistance from the home church. In 1865 in Trinity Episcopal Church the Orthodox Liturgy was held for the first time in American history. Among the congregants was writer Edith Wharton, who was married in the church in 1885.  In 1892, the reredos and altar were redesigned by Frederick Clarke Withers.

Cathedral of St. Sava

By 1930, as the rich and influential continued their uptown migration, the neighborhood around Madison Square had seriously declined. The chapel was now located within the Tenderloin, the city's main entertainment and red light district, and the congregation had dwindled. A Serbian Orthodox congregation, founded in the 1930s, purchased the building in 1942, with assistance from various Serbian churches, and the building re-opened in 1944 as a Serbian Orthodox cathedral dedicated to Saint Sava, the patron saint of the Serbs. The first pastor was Rev. Dushan Shoulkletovich. Peter II, the last king of Yugoslavia attended services here.

Gradual changes were made to the sanctuary to make it more Eastern Orthodox in style.  A hand-carved oak iconostasis was added in 1962. The Byzantine, hand-carved Iconostasis, brought from the Monastery of St. Naum in Ohrid, Yugoslavia, was placed in the cathedral and blessed.

The Icons on the Iconostasis were written by Russian iconographer, Ivan Meljinkov.

When a bomb went off near the church on September 4, 1966 destroying some of the stained glass, they were replaced with new ones commissioned in Byzantine style.

Serbian Orthodox Patriarch Pavle visited St. Sava Cathedral in October 1992. This was the first time the New York Church community was visited by a Patriarch.

Outside the church are busts of Bishop Nikolai Velimirovich, who was instrumental in founding the parish, helped to organize the Serbian Orthodox Church in America, and was in later years the "luminary-in-residence" at the cathedral; Nikola Tesla, the inventor and entrepreneur; and Michael Pupin, a physicist of Serbian heritage.

Prior to the fire of May 1, 2016 around $4 million had been spent on renovations to the cathedral's roof, gutters, and its attached community center in the past decade. The church's ceiling was repainted during those renovations to depict a nighttime sky.

2016 fire
On May 1, 2016, a massive fire occurred at the church, on the day Orthodox Christians were celebrating Easter, destroying most of the building. The four-alarm fire started at 6:49 p.m. local time and was brought under control by 8:30 p.m. employing more than 170 firefighters overall.

There was one minor injury.

The stone walls of the cathedral remain standing, and have been deemed to be structurally sound and not currently in danger of collapsing. Church officials have indicated they will examine whether any part of the structure could be preserved.

The parish house associated with the Chapel Complex was not harmed by fire.

Aftermath 

St. Sava parishioners reunited a few blocks away the first Sunday after the fire at Gramercy Park's Episcopal Calvary-St. George's Parish Church to worship.

Church officials indicate there will be plans to rebuild at the current site. Offers of support, including a letter from Patriarch Bartholomew, have been shared with the parishioners of the church.

Serbia's Foreign Minister Ivica Dačić indicated that the City of New York would be asked through diplomatic channels to aid in the rebuilding of the church. He also indicated Prime Minister Aleksandar Vučić authorized him to say that the government will help rebuild the church, "because it has great significance for the Serbian community and the Serbian spirit in New York."

As of two days after the fire, the definitive cause of the fire had not been determined. Candles that had not been properly extinguished after an Easter service were identified as a likely cause, according to a spokesperson of the New York City Fire Department (FDNY).  A caretaker told fire marshals that he stowed the candles in a cardboard box under a piece of wooden furniture in a rear corner of the 161-year-old church.

Nearly a month after the fire FDNY spokesman Frank Gribbon indicated conclusively that, "Fire marshals have ... determined that candles, which had not been completely extinguished, caused the fire." It was reported that the city has ordered the remains of the church demolished, calling them unstable. The Buildings Department quickly clarified that the inspection was not complete and they had not ordered the immediate demolition of the building. In August 2016 the parish announced that the Building Department ordered metal beams be used to shore up the walls and the building be covered with a waterproof canvas to keep it from being damaged further by the elements.  The parish announced they anticipate that effort to be completed in September 2016.

In May 2018 the parish filed a lawsuit against their insurer Church Mutual for $47M USD.  The insurer's payment was $12.7M USD based on the 1945 purchase price and subsequent improvements.  The church countered that the payment did not account for present day rebuilding costs will be approximately $60M USD. The parish and the insurer reached an undisclosed settlement in April 2019.
  Installation of the new roof over the nave was completed in July 2019. As of November 2019 steel I-beams for the new floor were being installed as well as framing for the windows which will be fitted with temporary acrylic panels. An image captured in March 2020 showed that the building had been enclosed.

On February 7, 2023 the first Divine Liturgy since the fire was held within the shell of the partially rebuilt cathedral.

See also
 Serbian Orthodox Eparchy of Eastern America
 Shadeland: Most Holy Mother Of God Monastery (Springboro, Pennsylvania)
 Sheffield Lake, Ohio: St. Mark Serbian Orthodox Monastery (Sheffield, Ohio)
 Richfield, Ohio: Synaxis: St. Archangel Gabriel Serbian Orthodox Monastery, also known as "New Marcha", Richfield, Ohio
 St. Nikolaj of Žiča Monastery (China, Michigan)
 Saint Sava Serbian Orthodox Monastery and Seminary in Libertyville, Illinois
 List of New York City Designated Landmarks in Manhattan from 14th to 59th Streets
 National Register of Historic Places listings in Manhattan from 14th to 59th Streets

References

External links

Official website
 Trinity Chapel records at Trinity Wall Street Archives
Cathedral of St. Sava
Trinity Chapel, Edith Wharton's New York, January 20, 2013

1855 establishments in New York (state)
19th-century Episcopal church buildings
2016 fires in the United States
2016 in New York City
Cathedrals in New York City
Churches completed in 1855
Churches in Manhattan
Churches on the National Register of Historic Places in New York (state)
Eastern Orthodox churches in New York City
Building and structure fires in New York City
Church fires in the United States
Former Episcopal church buildings in New York City
Gothic Revival church buildings in New York City
New York City Designated Landmarks in Manhattan
Properties of religious function on the National Register of Historic Places in Manhattan
Richard Upjohn church buildings
Serbian Orthodox church buildings in the United States
Flatiron District